Events from the year 2020 in Albania.

Incumbents
President: Ilir Meta
Prime Minister: Edi Rama
Deputy Prime Minister: Erion Braçe

Events
Ongoing – COVID-19 pandemic in Albania

March 
March 8 – The first two cases of COVID-19 in the country were confirmed, one of whom had traveled to Florence.
March 10
President Ilir Meta calls for retired Albanian doctors to re-enter the work force.
It was discovered that a woman from Maryland contracted COVID-19 after visiting Albania and spending time in a Turkish airport.
March 11 –  The first COVID-19 death in the country was reported: an elderly woman in Durrës.

May 

 17 May – The National Theatre in Tirana was demolished after a two-year debate to conserve and protect it.

December 
December 8 – The Albanian police's killing of 25-year-old Klodjan Rasha, who had violated the country's COVID-19 nightly curfew, resulted in several nights of violent rioting in Tirana.
December 29 – Albania's prime minister Edi Rama replaces foreign minister Gent Cakaj, who had resigned, with former defense minister Olta Xhaçka. Xhaçka's defense ministry seat is filled by Niko Peleshi. The prime minister gave no reason for the government reshuffle.

Deaths

February
February 7 – Nexhmije Pagarusha, singer and actress (b. 1933).
February 26 – Nexhmije Hoxha, politician (b. 1921).
February 29 – Vito Kapo, politician (b. 1922).

See also 
 List of years in Albania
 2020 in Albania

References

External links
 

 
2020s in Albania
Years of the 21st century in Albania
Albania
Albania